HCM Baia Mare may refer to:  
 CS Minaur Baia Mare (women's handball), a Romanian handball team founded in 2015
 HCM Baia Mare (women's handball), a Romanian handball team disbanded in 2016